Ruposh (Urdu: روپوش) is a 2022 Pakistani romantic television film produced by Abdullah Kadwani and Asad Qureshi (producer) under their production house 7th Sky Entertainment. It was written by Nooran Makhdoom and directed by Ali Faizan, starring Haroon Kadwani in lead role opposite Kinza Hashmi. The television film premiered on 7 January 2022 in Pakistan on Geo Entertainment.

Cast

Main cast 
 Haroon Kadwani as Salaar Shah
 Kinza Hashmi as Zunaira Ashfaq

Supporting cast 
 Mehmood Aslam as Ameer Shah (Salaar's father)
 Saba Faisal as Sabeen (Zunaira's mother)
 Hina Khawaja Bayat as Salaar's mother
 Saife Hassan as Ashfaq (Zunaira's father)
 Shabbir Janas Irfan (Rohail's father & Ashfaq's friend)
 Raeed Muhammad Alam as Rohail Irfan
 Arisha Razi as Zunaira's sister
 Aadi Khan as Zubair
 Zohreh Amir as Zooni or Zunaira’s friend
 Shees Sajjad Gul as Young Salaar Shah (Child)
 Mujtaba Abbas Khan
 Yasir Alam

Plot 
A young free-spirited man with past traumatic family experiences comes across a beautiful stranger, but their bitter first encounter triggers his unresolved anger furthermore. Salaar Shah's excessive token of affection for Zunaira stuns everyone in their university and eventually compels her to surrender to love. But just when she least expects it, Salaar gets back at her for revenge. His vengeance soon brings him to terms with his true feelings but he is then left with little to no time to undo his mistake.

Soundtrack 
Ruposh consisted of two original soundtracks titled "Ruposh" and "Humraazi". Both the soundtracks are written and performed by Wajhi Farooki while the music composition is done by his team.

Track listing 
Following is the listing of complete soundtracks of Ruposh.

Reception 
The television film received countrywide praising for its direction, writing, location, cast and cinematography. Ruposh crossed the milestone of bagging 105 GRPs on the rating chart, the highest in the history of Pakistani telefilms. Following the success of the film, a celebration on 13 March 2022 was organized by the producers, where cast of the film and various artists from the TV industry made an appearance.

Digital media 
Ruposh went on to trend at #1 on YouTube in just three days and exhibited a record-shattering performance of getting the fastest 10 millions views. The telefilm also attained massive success on digital platforms with 180.4 million views on TikTok, Instagram and YouTube.

References

2022 films
2022 television films
Pakistani television films
Urdu-language Pakistani films
2020s romantic action films
2020s Urdu-language films